Chrysanthemum Tran is a Vietnamese American poet, writer, and performer based in Rhode Island.

In 2016, Tran became the first transgender woman to be a finalist at Women of the World Poetry Slam.

In 2019, Tran was awarded $25,000 to complete her first collection of poems and develop a poetry symposium in Wakefield, Rhode Island.

In 2022, she was featured in the PBS project, True Colors: LGBTQ+ Our Music, Our Stories.

Early life 
Tran grew up the child of refugees in a conservative, religious, predominantly-immigrant neighborhood in Oklahoma City, Oklahoma. Due to learning English as a second language and having a lisp and a stutter, Tran was put into speech therapy as a kid.

Tran's father was a photographer and her mother retouched glamor shots, which inspired Tran to pursue photography as a form of expression. Growing up, she wanted to be a fashion photographer. Tran's photography mentor, Paul Tran, helped her realize she wanted to communicate beyond the medium and got her involved with poetry.

At age 18, Tran moved to Providence, Rhode Island, to attend Brown University. As a freshman at Brown, Tran involved herself in activism on campus, organizing students and activists against a lecture by NYPD Commissioner Raymond Kelly, who is known for his hyper-surveillance of Muslim people and for developing the stop-and-frisk policy. Tran represented Brown University at College Unions Poetry Slam Invitational for three years.

Mural 
In 2017, Brooklyn-based artist, poet, and filmmaker, Jess X Snow, painted a mural of Tran, in Rochester, New York at the annual WALL\THERAPY muralism festival. The 2017 festival prompt was to paint the best group or person improving the community. Snow and Tran attended Brown University together and later attended Rachel McKibbens' poetry retreat for women of color, The Pink Door, in 2016. The mural featured a quote from Tran's poem "Biological Woman", "I transcend biology / I'm supernova / an extraterrestrial gender / I drink all the water on Mars & rename that my blood." Snow said, "The magic of her words in the face of transphobia and misogyny is what directly inspired the mural." The piece is the first mural in the city to spotlight a person from a queer identity.

Poetry competitions 
Through winning local grand slams, Tran has earned herself spots at Rustbelt Regional Poetry Slam, Feminine Empowerment Movement Slam (FEMS), Women of the World Poetry Slam (WoWPS), National Poetry Slam (NPS), and College Unions Poetry Slam Invitational (CUPSI)—more than once for the latter three competitions. She has performed on the final stages of Rustbelt and FEMS once, both on teams that won the entire competitions. She's performed on final stage of WoWPS twice. She has made it to the semi-finals at NPS twice  and CUPSI three times.

Commentary on Stonewall 
Tran has written pieces on the Stonewall Uprising for them and The Nation, and has commented on Stonewall for a New York Times video. Tran argues that when Stonewall is discussed, the "lifelong care work of organizing and activism" of those involved is typically erased, especially the efforts of transgender women like Marsha P Johnson, Sylvia Rivera, and Miss Major Griffin Gracy.

On Trans Day of Remembrance in Providence, Rhode Island, in 2017, Tran spoke about Stonewall and performed poetry with her longtime friend, poetry teammate, and Brown alumna, Justice Ameer Gaines. Gaines is a Black transgender women.

Anthem 
In 2018, Tran, aged 22, and Justice Gaines, aged 23, opened for Kit Yan in the show Queer Heartache, which impressed artistic producer Mark Lunsford, who saw their potential to carry their own show.

In 2019, Tran and Gaines were hired to star in and produce a spoken word show by the American Repertory Theater at the Oberon in Cambridge, Massachusetts. Together they created and headlined, Anthem, a show dedicated to humanizing transgender women in the arts and generally. WBUR called Tran and Gaines, "two of the most recognized trans poets of color on the local and national poetry scene". Trans and Ameer invited other artists, nearly all who identify as trans, queer, or non-binary, to join Anthem's performances. The collaboration was an effort to give back to the LGBTQ community and to incorporate more than two transgender perspectives.

Works

Shows 

 Anthem, Oberon, 2019

Essays 

 "How Do You Create Community Out of a Rainbow of Difference?", The Nation, June 2019
 "When Remembering Stonewall, We Need To Listen to Those Who Were There", them., June 2018

Notable Poems 

 "I Don't Even Like Sports", Poetry Foundation, 2022
 "Biological Woman (After Maya Angelou)", Finals at Women of the World Poetry Slam, 2018
 "Binge", Muzzle Magazine, June 2017
 "Behold! A Spectacle", The Offing, February 2016
 "This Poem Is For Us", National Poetry Slam Finals, 2016
 "On Using the Trans Panic Defense", The Offing, February 2016
 "On (Not) Forgiving My Mother", Finals at Rustbelt Regional Poetry Slam, 2016
 "Discovery (For Jennifer Laude)", Finals at Providence Poetry Slam, 2016
 "Vampires", College Unions Poetry Slam Invitational, 2016
 "Transplant", College Unions Poetry Slam Invitational, 2016
 "Why I Never Reported My Rape", Women of the World Poetry Slam, 2016
 "Cognates", Women of the World Poetry Slam, 2016
 "I Had An Ultrasound", National Poetry Slam Semi-Finals, 2015

Anthologies 

 "Ode to Enclaves", Ink Knows No Borders: Poems of the Immigrant and Refugee Experience, 2019
 "On Using the Trans Panic Defense" & "On (Not) Forgiving My Mother", Bettering American Poetry Vol. 2, 2018

Speaking and commentary 

 "The Lunch Room Episode 16", American Repertory Theater, 2020
 "Who Threw the First Brick at Stonewall? Let's Argue About It", The New York Times, 2019
 "Queering the Present", PanAsian Solidarity Coalition Spring Festival, 2018
 "#WOCMakingHistory", We, Ceremony, 2018

Awards and honors 

 Robert and Margaret MacColl Johnson Fund Fellow, Rhode Island Foundation, 2018
 Poetry Slam Champion, Feminine Empowerment Movement Slam, 2017
 Fellow, Pink Door, 2017
 Best Poet & Best Poem, College Unions Poetry Slam Invitational, 2016
 Poetry Slam Champion, Rustbelt, 2016
 Finalist, Women of the World Poetry Slam, 2016
 Pushing the Art Forward, College Unions Poetry Slam Invitational, 2015

References 

Living people
21st-century American poets
21st-century American essayists
American writers of Vietnamese descent
American transgender writers
American LGBT poets
Vietnamese LGBT poets
American LGBT people of Asian descent
American poets of Asian descent
Brown University alumni
Writers from Providence, Rhode Island
Poets from Rhode Island
Transgender poets
LGBT people from Rhode Island
21st-century American women writers
American women poets
Year of birth missing (living people)